Zagora may refer to:

Places

Africa 
Zagora, Morocco
Zagora Province, Morocco
Mount Zagora, a mountain in south-eastern Morocco

Asia 
Zagora (Paphlagonia), a town of ancient Paphlagonia

Europe 
Zagora, Greece, a village in Greece
Dalmatian Zagora, a region in Croatia
Zagóra (disambiguation), several places in Poland
Zagore (region), an area in Bulgaria
Stara Zagora, a city in Bulgaria
Nova Zagora, a city in Bulgaria
Zagora, Kanal ob Soči, a village in the Municipality of Kanal ob Soči, western Slovenia
Zagora, Krapina-Zagorje County, a village near Krapina, Croatia
, a village near Trebinje, Bosnia and Herzegovina

Other uses 
Zagora (horse) (born 2007), thoroughbred racehorse
Zagora (Loose Ends album), an album by R&B band Loose Ends

See also
 
Zagori (disambiguation)
Zagore (disambiguation) 
Zagorje (disambiguation) 
Záhorie, a region in Slovakia